Salima Begum is a Pakistani teacher, teacher educator, and educationist from Gilgit-Baltistan. She was one of the top 10 finalists for the Global Teacher Prize in 2017 and won the World of Difference Award in 2019. Currently, she is the headteacher at the Government Elementary College For Women, Gilgit.

Early life and education
Salima was born in Oshikhandass, Gilgit-Baltistan, northern Pakistan. She received her early school education in her hometown. She obtained a degree for bachelor of science education (B.S.Ed) at the University of Punjab. She earned a master’s degree in education at the Institutes for Educational Development (IED), Agha Khan University, in 2002. Later, she did graduation from the Institute of Education, University of London.

Career
Salima started her teaching career in 1992 as a primary teacher at a government elementary school for girls in Gilgit-Baltistan. Later in 1997, she initiated secondary science classes in the school.

She worked at the IED's Professional Development Centre, Northern Pakistan, where she supervised the implementation of a Whole School Improvement Program, a European Union (EU)-funded project aiming at improving school infrastructure, leadership, and management practices in five districts of Pakistan. In 2010, she also participated in implementing the Educational Development and Improvement Programme in Gilgit, which was sponsored by the AusAid. She has also contributed to the Teacher Education project launched by the USAID.

Salima has trained around 7,000 teachers in Gilgit-Baltistan and 8,000 more across Pakistan during the course of her career.

Awards and honours

References

Living people
People from Gilgit District
University of the Punjab alumni
Pakistani educators
Year of birth missing (living people)